Zhutian Township, also spelled Jhutian, is a rural township in Pingtung County, Taiwan.

Geography

 Population: 16,038 people (February 2023) 
 Area: 
 Main ethic group: Hakka

Administrative divisions
The township comprises 15 villages:
 Dahu (大湖村)
 Erlun (二崙村)
 Fengming (鳳明村)
 Futian (福田村)
 Liuxiang (六巷村)
 Lufeng (履豐村)
 Meilun (美崙村)
 Nanshi (南勢村)
 Sizhou (泗洲村)
 Tiaodi (糶糴村)
 Toulun (頭崙村)
 Xishi (西勢村)
 Yongfeng (永豐村)
 Zhunan (竹南村)
 Zhutian (竹田村)

Economy

Zhutian is famous for its agricultural products.

Tourist attractions
 Pingtung Hakka Cultural Museum

Transportation

Rails

 TRA Xishi Station
 TRA Zhutian Station

Roads
The township is connected to Kaohsiung at Fengshan District through Provincial Highway 88.

References

External links

Jhutian Township Office 

Townships in Pingtung County